Pedernales Falls State Park  is a 5,212-acre state park situated along the banks of the Pedernales River in Blanco County, Texas in the United States.

Location

History
Prior to the year 1970, the area that the park occupies was a working ranch, known as the Circle Bar Ranch. The state of Texas purchased the ranch in 1970, and opened the park in 1971.

Recreation
Many of the activities in Pedernales Falls State Park center around the Pedernales River: swimming, tubing, wading and fishing.  The park also has a number of picnic areas and campsites, including some primitive campsites that require a hike of over two miles to reach. There are also  of hiking and mountain biking trails, 10 miles of equestrian trails, and 14 miles of backpacking trails. There is a park store where you can purchase gift items and ice. The entrance fee is $6 daily for persons 13 years or older, children 12 and under are allowed in at no cost.

Like many rivers in central Texas, the Pedernales is prone to variable water levels. A sign at the park shows a relatively tranquil river in one picture and a raging wall of muddy water in the next picture, said to be taken only five minutes after the first. The speed at which flash floods can arise along this river has resulted in several deaths at the park.

Weather

Nature

The river limestone at Pedernales Falls is 300 million years old. Erosion from deposits in the Cretaceous period created the current formations.

Wildlife in the park is typical of the Texas Hill Country, including white-tailed deer, coyotes, rabbits, armadillos, wild hogs, skunks, opossums and raccoons.  Many types of birds, including the endangered golden-cheeked warbler, can be found in the summer.

Trees commonly found in the area include juniper, pecan, sycamore, elm, walnut, hackberry, and others.

Venomous snakes most commonly found in the Texas Hill Country are the western diamondback rattlesnake, eastern copperhead, and the water moccasin.

See also

Balcones Canyonlands NWR
Barton Creek
Central Texas
Colorado River (Texas)
Double Mountain Fork Brazos River
Edwards Plateau
Enchanted Rock
List of Texas state parks
Llano River
Mount Bonnell
Texas Hill Country

References

External links

Pedernales Falls State Park information from the Texas Parks and Wildlife Department

Film footage of Pedernales Falls State Park from Exploring the Texas State Park System from the Texas Archive of the Moving Image

State parks of Texas
Waterfalls of Texas
Landforms of Blanco County, Texas
Protected areas of Blanco County, Texas
Protected areas established in 1971
Texas Hill Country